WAAO may refer to:

 WAAO-FM, a radio station (93.7 FM) licensed to serve Andalusia, Alabama, United States
 WAAO-LD, a low-power television station (channel 32, virtual 40) licensed to serve Andalusia, Alabama
 WAAO-AM, a defunct AM radio station